The 2005 Kraft Nabisco Championship was a women's professional golf tournament, held March 24–27 at Mission Hills Country Club in Rancho Mirage, California. This was the 34th edition of the Kraft Nabisco Championship, and the 23rd edition as a major championship. ESPN and ABC Sports televised the event.

Annika Sörenstam, the champion in 2001 and 2002, won the event for the third and final time, eight strokes ahead of runner-up Rosie Jones. It was the eighth of her ten major titles.

Past champions in the field

Made the cut

Source:

Missed the cut

Source:

Final leaderboard
Sunday, March 27, 2005

Source:

Amateurs: Wie (E), Pressel (+2), Granada (+6), Park (+10).

References

External links
Golf Observer leaderboard

Chevron Championship
Golf in California
Sports competitions in California
Kraft Nabisco Championship
Kraft Nabisco Championship
Kraft Nabisco Championship
Kraft Nabisco Championship